Psalm 149 is the 149th psalm of the Book of Psalms, a hymn as the book's penultimate piece. The first verse of the psalm calls to praise in singing, in English in the King James Version: "Sing a new song unto the Lord". Similar to Psalm 96 and Psalm 98 (Cantate Domino), Psalm 149 calls to praise God in music and dance, because he has chosen his people and helped them to victory. Psalm 149 is also marked by its martial tone: it calls on the people to be ready to fight.

The psalm forms a regular part of Jewish, Catholic, Lutheran and Anglican liturgies. It has often been set to music, notably by Antonín Dvořák who set the complete psalm for chorus and orchestra, while Bach chose only the first three verses for his motet Singet dem Herrn ein neues Lied, BWV 225. It was paraphrased in hymns.

Background and themes 
Psalm 149 shares its first line with Psalm 98, known as Cantate Domino. Both psalms call for praise of God in music and dance, because God has chosen his people and helped them to victory. Psalm 149 also calls to be ready to fight, with "swords sharpened on both sides in their hands". The end of the psalm has been interpreted differently by commentators. Augustine of Hippo wrote that the phrase of the sword has a "mystical meaning", dividing temporal and eternal things. James L. Mays comments: "There is an eschatological, almost apocalyptic, dimension to the psalm's anticipation of a warfare of the faithful that will settle the conflict of the kingdoms of this world and the kingdom of God".

Citing verses 5 and 6, the Talmud (Berakhot 5) says the praises said by the pious on their beds refer to the recital of the Bedtime Shema. The Shema is like a "double-edged sword" that can destroy both inner and outer demons and evil spirits. This image of a double-edged sword also refers to Israel's power of praises of God, which enable them to avenge themselves against the nations that persecuted them when the nations receive their punishment at the end of days.

C. S. Rodd notes that some writers divide the psalm into two sections, verses 1-4 and 5-9 (such as the layout in the New King James Version), but others create three sections, verses 1-3, 4-6, and 7-9. Support for a three-section structure "is seen primarily in the triad of infinitives in verses 7-9", namely to execute vengeance ..., to bind their kings ..., to execute judgment ... in the King James Version.

Text

Hebrew Bible version
The following is the Hebrew text of Psalm 149:

King James Version
 Praise ye the LORD. Sing unto the Lord a new song, and his praise in the congregation of saints.
 Let Israel rejoice in him that made him: let the children of Zion be joyful in their King.
 Let them praise his name in the dance: let them sing praises unto him with the timbrel and harp.
 For the Lord taketh pleasure in his people: he will beautify the meek with salvation.
 Let the saints be joyful in glory: let them sing aloud upon their beds.
 Let the high praises of God be in their mouth, and a two-edged sword in their hand;
 To execute vengeance upon the heathen, and punishments upon the people;
 To bind their kings with chains, and their nobles with fetters of iron;
 To execute upon them the judgment written: this honour have all his saints. Praise ye the Lord.

Uses

Judaism 
Psalm 149 is recited in its entirety in the Pesukei D'Zimra ("Verses of Praise") section of the daily morning prayer. It is traditionally grouped with Psalms 146, 147, 148, and 150 – the five concluding chapters of the Book of Psalms, which are all recited in their entirety during Pesukei D'Zimra – under the classification of "halleluyah" psalms which express praise of God.

Verse 2 is recited by the creeping creatures in Perek Shira.

Verse 5 is recited after saying Mishnayos for the departed.

Catholic Church
The psalm is one of the Laudate psalms or hymn psalms. With Psalm 148 and Psalm 150, Psalm 149 was recited or sung daily during the solemn service of matins, according to the Rule of St. Benedict (530AD).

In the Liturgy of the Hours, Psalm 149 is used for Sunday Lauds of the Roman rite in the first week. It is also used for feasts and solemnities week. In the Eucharistic liturgy, it is the Saturday after the Epiphany or before January 7 epiphany, and at Easter, the Monday of the sixth week.

Musical settings 
With an incipit about singing, the psalm and especially its first line has often been set to music, in various languages. Heinrich Schütz published a composition of its beginning in Latin, "Cantate Domino canticum novum", in 1625 in his Cantiones sacrae as SWV 81, scored for four voices and basso continuo. He set the psalm in German, titled Die heilige Gemeine (The holy congregation) as part of the Becker Psalter, as SWV 254. Matthäus Apelles von Löwenstern published the hymn "Singt dem Herrn ein neues Lied", a paraphrase of the psalm, in 1644. BWV 411 is Johann Sebastian Bach's four-part setting of Löwenstern's hymn tune. Bach's cantata Singet dem Herrn ein neues Lied, BWV 190, for New Year's Day, and his motet Singet dem Herrn ein neues Lied, BWV 225, composed in the 1720s like the cantata, both open with words taken from the beginning of the psalm. Jean-Joseph de Mondonville set the psalm as a motet, one of his nine grand motets, in 1734.

Antonín Dvořák set the complete psalm for mixed choir and orchestra, as his Op. 79. Bernard Rose set the psalm in English as Praise ye the Lord for unaccompanied double choir in 1949. Philip James set it for choir in 1956. Raymond Wilding-White set the psalm for two sopranos, violin and viola. English-language hymns paraphrasing Psalm 149, or taking inspiration from it, include "I sing the mighty power of God", "Let all the world in every corner sing", "Lord of the Dance", "Praise the Lord, sing Hallelujah", "Songs of praise the angels sang", and "We sing the mighty power of God".

References

External links 

 
 Ted Hildebrandt: Psalms Bibliography 2005
 Psalm 149 biblegateway.com
 Psalm 149 – The High Praises of God and a Two-Edged Sword enduringword.com
 Charles H. Spurgeon: The Treasury of David / by Charles H. Spurgeon / Psalm 149 romans45.org
 

149
Pesukei dezimra
Siddur of Orthodox Judaism